223rd Brigade may refer to:
223rd Brigade (United Kingdom)
223rd Mixed Brigade (Spain)